Meuselwitz is a town in the Altenburger Land district, in Thuringia, Germany. It is situated 12 km northwest of Altenburg and 11 km east of Zeitz.

History
During World War II, a subcamp of the Buchenwald concentration camp operated here. It provided slave labour for HASAG, the third largest consumer of forced labour during the war. All satellites of Buchenwald were HASAG factories. The Meuselwitz plant used 1,666 prisoners, of which, 1,376 were women. The SS charged less for women; they had a higher mortality rate. Wintersdorf has been part of the town Meuselwitz since December 1, 2007.

People 
 Wolfgang Hilbig (1941-2007), German author and poet

References

Altenburger Land
Duchy of Saxe-Altenburg